Catoptria profluxella is a moth in the family Crambidae. It was described by Hugo Theodor Christoph in 1887. It is found in Transcaucasia and the northern Caucasus.

References

Crambini
Moths described in 1887
Moths of Asia